A notable ongoing event was the race for the South Pole.

Events

January 

 January 1 – A decade after federation, the Northern Territory and the Australian Capital Territory are added to the Commonwealth of Australia.
 January 3
 1911 Kebin earthquake: An earthquake of 7.7 moment magnitude strikes near Almaty in Russian Turkestan, killing 450 or more people.
 Siege of Sidney Street in London: Two Latvian anarchists die, after a seven-hour siege against a combined police and military force. Home Secretary Winston Churchill arrives to oversee events.
 January 5 – Egypt's Zamalek SC is founded as a general sports and Association football club by Belgian lawyer George Merzbach as Qasr El Nile Club.
 January 14 – Roald Amundsen's South Pole expedition makes landfall, on the eastern edge of the Ross Ice Shelf.
 January 18 – Eugene B. Ely lands on the deck of the USS Pennsylvania stationed in San Francisco harbor, the first time an aircraft has landed on a ship.
 January 26 – The United States and Canada announce the successful negotiation of their first reciprocal trade agreement.

February 

 February 5
 The Missouri State Capitol building in Jefferson City, Missouri is destroyed by fire after a bolt of lightning strikes the dome.
 The revolution in Haiti is suppressed after the leader, General Montreuil Guillaume, is captured by government troops and shot. General Millionard is executed two days later.
 February 17 – The first "quasi-official" airmail flight occurs, when Fred Wiseman carries three letters between Petaluma and Santa Rosa, California.
 February 18
 The first official air mail flight, second overall, takes place in British India from Allahabad to Naini when Henri Pequet carries 6,500 letters a distance of 13 km.
 A serious earthquake causes a landslide that creates Lake Sarez in modern-day Tajikistan.

March 

 March 19 – International Women's Day is celebrated for the first time across Europe.
 March 25 – The Triangle Shirtwaist Factory fire in New York City kills 146 people.
 March 29 – The United States Army adopts a new service pistol, the M1911, designed by John Browning (it remains the U.S. service pistol for 74 years).

April 

 April 3 – Jean Sibelius conducts the première of his Symphony No. 4, in Helsinki.
 April 8 – Heike Kamerlingh Onnes discovers superconductivity; he presents his findings on April 28.
 April 13 – Mexican Revolution: Rebels take Agua Prieta on the Sonora–Arizona border; government troops take the town back April 17, when the rebel leader "Red" López gets drunk.
 April 18 – , a 5,557-ton Portuguese passenger liner en route from Mozambique to Lisbon, strikes Bellows Rock just off Cape Point and sinks.
 April 19 – Mexican Revolution: Francisco I. Madero's troops besiege Ciudad Juárez, but General Juan J. Navarro refuses his surrender demand.
 April 26 – HŠK Građanski Zagreb (predecessor of GNK Dinamo Zagreb), a Croatian Association football club, is founded in Zagreb.
 April 27 – Huanghuagang Uprising: In China, rebels take five villages in an attempt to create a power base to fight Imperial rule; those who die are remembered as "The 72 Martyrs" (the event is also called the "Second Guangzhou Uprising" and the "Yellow Flower Mound Revolt").

May 

 May 8 – Mexican Revolution: Pancho Villa launches an attack against government troops in Ciudad Juárez without Madero's permission; the government troops surrender on May 10.
 May 13–15 – Mexican Revolution: Torreón massacre – Over 300 Chinese residents are massacred by the revolutionary forces of Francisco I. Madero, in the Mexican city of Torreón.
 May 15 –Standard Oil is dissolved by the Supreme Court of the United States into 34 separate oil companies including Exxon, Mobil, Chevron, Texaco, and others due to violation of the Sherman Anti-Trust Act
 May 17 – Mexican Revolution: Porfirio Díaz is convinced to resign, but does not do so yet.
 May 21 – Mexican Revolution: In Ciudad Juárez, a peace treaty is signed between Madero's rebels and government troops.
 May 24 – Mexican Revolution: Government troops fire at anti-Diaz demonstrators in Mexico City, killing about 200 (officials claim only 40).
 May 25 – Mexican Revolution: Porfirio Díaz signs his resignation and leaves for Veracruz; on May 31 he leaves for exile in France.
 May 30 – The very first Indianapolis 500 automobile race is held in the United States, won by Ray Harroun at an average speed of 74.59 miles per hour.

June 

 June 7 – Mexican Revolution: Francisco Madero arrives in Mexico City, just after the 1911 Michoacán earthquake.
 June 14 –  departs Southampton, England, for her maiden voyage, with a first call at Cherbourg, France.
 June 15 – RMS Olympic arrives in Queenstown, Ireland, to discharge and take up passengers.
 June 21 –  arrives in New York at the end of her maiden voyage. She proceeds to her quarantine station off Staten Island, which she leaves at 7:45 a.m., and is saluted on her way up New York Harbor by all kinds of craft as she steams to Pier 59 in the North River. With the assistance of twelve tugs, Olympic is safely moored at 10 a.m.
 June 22 – George V and Mary are crowned King and Queen of the United Kingdom and the British Dominions, at Westminster Abbey in London. Moored at Pier 59 of New York Harbor,  is decorated for the occasion.
 June 23 – Frank C. Mars starts the Mars Candy Factory in Tacoma, Washington, origin of Mars, Incorporated, the global confectionery and pet food brand.
 June 28
  departs New York for her maiden eastbound voyage home to Southampton, England.
 The Nakhla meteorite falls in the Abu Hummus region of Egypt, providing evidence of water on Mars.
 June – The Sixth Conference of the International Woman Suffrage Alliance is held in Stockholm, Sweden.

July 

 July 1 – The presence of the German warship Panther in the Moroccan port of Agadir triggers the Agadir Crisis.
 July 4 – , having crossed the Atlantic, discharges passengers and mails off Plymouth, England.
 July 5 –  arrives in Southampton, England, ending her maiden eastbound voyage from New York.
 July 24 – Hiram Bingham rediscovers Machu Picchu in Peru.
 July 28 – The Australasian Antarctic Expedition began as the SY Aurora departed London.

August 

 August 17–20 – Britain's National Railway strike of 1911, its first national strike of railway workers; on August 19 it leads to the Llanelli riots in Wales which result in 6 deaths.
 August 21 – Leonardo da Vinci's Mona Lisa is stolen from the Louvre museum in Paris by Vincenzo Peruggia; the painting is returned in 1913.
 August 27 – CSKA Moscow, a professional multi-sports club in Russia, is officially founded.

September 

 September 20 –  collides with HMS Hawke in The Solent, causing considerable damage to both ships.
 September 25 – French battleship Liberté explodes at anchor in Toulon, France, killing around 300 onboard and in the surrounding area.
 September 29 – Italy declares war on the Ottoman Empire.

October 

 October 4 – China adopts "Cup of Solid Gold" as its first national anthem. However, it is never performed publicly and is replaced a few months later with a new composition.
 October 7 – Liberal leader Karl Staaff returns as Prime Minister of Sweden after a Riksdag election victory based on the promises of defense cuts and social reforms.
 October 10 – The Wuchang Uprising starts the Xinhai Revolution, that leads to the founding of the Republic of China.
 October 16 – Mexican Revolution: Felix Diaz, nephew of Porfirio Díaz, occupies the port of Veracruz, as a sign of rebellion against Madero.
 October 26 – In American baseball, the Philadelphia Athletics defeat the New York Giants, 13–2, to win the 1911 World Series in 6 games. The game is tied 1–1 after three innings, but with four runs in the fourth, and seven runs in the seventh, the A's demolish the Giants. The most unusual play of the game is an inside-the-park home run made by the A's Jack Barry, on a bunt.

November 

 November 1 – The world's first combat aerial bombing mission takes place in Libya, during the Italo-Turkish War. Second Lieutenant Giulio Gavotti of Italy drops several small bombs.
 November 3 – Chevrolet officially enters the automobile market in the United States, in competition with the Ford Model T.
 November 4 – The Treaty of Berlin brings the Agadir Crisis to a close. This treaty leads Morocco to be split between France (as a protectorate) and Spain (as the colony of Spanish Sahara), with Germany forfeiting all claims to Morocco. In return, France gives Germany a portion of the French Congo (as Kamerun) and Germany cedes some of German Kamerun to France (as Chad).
 November 5 – Italy annexes Tripoli and Cyrenaica (confirmed by an act of the Italian Parliament on February 25, 1912).
 November 17 – Omega Psi Phi fraternity is founded on the campus of Howard University, in Washington, D.C.

December 

 December 1 – Outer Mongolia, the forerunner of modern-day Mongolia, is declared independent from the Chinese Empire.
 December 2 – Australasian Antarctic Expedition sets sail from Hobart.
 December 9 – A mine explosion near Briceville, Tennessee kills 84 miners, despite rescue efforts led by the United States Bureau of Mines.
 December 12 – The Delhi Durbar is held to mark the coronation of George V and Queen Mary as Emperor and Empress of India, and the transfer of the capital of British India from Calcutta to Delhi.
 December 14 – Roald Amundsen's expedition reaches the South Pole.
 December 18 – The first exhibition by Der Blaue Reiter group of painters opens in Munich.
 December 18–28 – George V's 1911 hunting trip in Nepal.
 December 24 – Lackawanna Cut-Off railway line opens in New Jersey and Pennsylvania.
 December 29 – Sun Yat-sen is elected Provisional President of the Republic of China.

Date unknown 
 The Encyclopædia Britannica Eleventh Edition is published under American management in England, by Cambridge University Press.
 New Zealand-born British physicist Ernest Rutherford deduces the existence of a compact atomic nucleus from experiments involving Rutherford scattering, proposing the Rutherford model of the atom.
 The first suffrage organisation in Romania, Liga Drepturile si Datoriile Femeii, is founded.
 The Air Intelligence branch of Russia's Airforce is created.

Births

January 

 January 1
 Hank Greenberg, American baseball player (d. 1986)
 Roman Totenberg, Polish-American violinist (d. 2012)
 January 2 – Pavel Rychagov, Soviet air ace, air force general (d. 1941)
 January 3 – Al Sack, American conductor, composer and violinist (d. 1947)
 January 5 – Jean-Pierre Aumont, French actor (d. 2001)
 January 7 – Butterfly McQueen, American actress (d. 1995)
 January 10
 Binod Bihari Chowdhury, Bangladeshi revolutionary (d. 2013)
 Norman Heatley, British biologist (d. 2004)
 January 11
 Brunhilde Pomsel, German broadcaster and secretary (d. 2017)
 Zenkō Suzuki, 44th Prime Minister of Japan (d. 2004)
 January 13 – Joh Bjelke-Petersen, 31st Premier of Queensland (d. 2005)
 January 15
 January 16 – Eduardo Frei Montalva, Chilean politician, 29th President of Chile (d. 1982)
 January 17
 John S. McCain Jr., American admiral (d. 1981)
 George Stigler, American economist, Nobel Prize laureate (d. 1991)
 January 18
 José María Arguedas, Peruvian novelist, poet and anthropologist (d. 1969)
 Danny Kaye, American actor, comedian (d. 1987)
 January 19
 Ken Nelson, American record producer, music executive (d. 2008)
 Choor Singh, Singaporean judge (d. 2009)
 January 22 – Bruno Kreisky, Chancellor of Austria (d. 1990)
 January 25 – Kurt Maetzig, German director (d. 2012)
 January 26 – Polykarp Kusch, German-born physicist, Nobel Prize laureate (d. 1993)
 January 28 – Johan van Hulst, Dutch politician, academic, author and Yad Vashem recipient (d. 2018)
 January 29 – Peter von Siemens, German industrialist (d. 1986)
 January 30
 Roy Eldridge, American jazz musician (d. 1989)
 Hugh Marlowe, American film, television, stage and radio actor (d. 1982)
 January 31
 Eddie Byrne, Irish actor (d. 1981)
 Baba Vanga, blind Bulgarian mystic, clairvoyant and herbalist (d. 1996)

February 

 February 5 – Jussi Björling, Swedish tenor (d. 1960)
 February 6 – Ronald Reagan, 40th President of the United States and actor (d. 2004)
 February 8 – Elizabeth Bishop, American poet (d. 1979)
 February 10 – Victor Guillermo Ramos Rangel, Venezuelan classical musician (d. 1986)
 February 12
 Cearbhall Ó Dálaigh (Carroll Daly), 5th President of Ireland (d. 1978)
 Stephen H. Sholes, American recording executive (d. 1968)
 February 13 – Jean Muir, American actress (d. 1996)
 February 14 – Willem Johan Kolff, Dutch inventor (d. 2009)
 February 17 – Oskar Seidlin, Silesian-born Jewish-American literary scholar (d. 1984)
 February 19
 Bill Bowerman, American track athlete, co-founder of Nike, Inc. (d. 1999)
 Merle Oberon, British actress (d. 1979)
 February 24 – Eduardo Vañó Pastor, Spanish cartoonist (d. 1993)
 February 27 – Fanny Edelman, Argentine politician (d. 2011)
 February 28 – Otakar Vávra, Czech director (d. 2011)

March 

 March 1 – Mike Gilbert, New Zealand rugby union player (d. 2002)
 March 3 – Jean Harlow, American actress (d. 1937)
 March 5 – Wolfgang Larrazábal, 52nd President of Venezuela (d. 2003)
 March 6 – Nikolai Baibakov, Soviet statesman (d. 2008)
 March 8 – Alan Hovhaness, American composer (d. 2000)
 March 12 – Gustavo Díaz Ordaz, 49th President of Mexico (d. 1979)
 March 13 – L. Ron Hubbard, American author, founder of Scientology (d. 1986)
 March 16
 Pierre Harmel, 40th Prime Minister of Belgium (d. 2009)
 Josef Mengele, German Nazi war criminal (d. 1979)
 March 18 – Al Benton, American baseball player (d. 1968)
 March 20 – Alfonso García Robles, Mexican diplomat and politician, Nobel Peace Prize laureate (d. 1991)
 March 24
 Joseph Barbera, American cartoonist (d. 2006)
 Jane Drew, English architect (d. 1996)
 Ephraim Engleman, American rheumatologist (d. 2015)
 March 25 – Jack Ruby, American mobster, killer of Lee Harvey Oswald (d. 1967)
 March 26
 Bernard Katz, German-born biophysicist, Nobel Prize laureate (d. 2003)
 Tennessee Williams, American playwright (d. 1983)
 March 27 – Erich Heller, British philosopher (d. 1990)
 March 29 – Brigitte Horney, German-born actress (d. 1988)
 March 31
 Freddie Green, American jazz musician (d. 1987)
 Elisabeth Grümmer, German soprano (d. 1986)

April 

 April 3
 Stanisława Walasiewicz, Polish-born athlete (d. 1980)
 Sir Michael Woodruff, British/Australian surgeon (d. 2001)
 April 4 – Narciso J. Alegre, Filipino civil liberties advocate (d. 1980)
 April 5 – Hédi Amara Nouira, Tunisian politician, 11th Prime Minister of Tunisia (d. 1993)
 April 6 – Feodor Lynen, German biochemist, Nobel Prize laureate (d. 1979)
 April 8
 Melvin Calvin, American chemist, Nobel Prize laureate (d. 1997)
 Emil Cioran, Romanian philosopher and essayist (d. 1995)
 Ichirō Fujiyama, Japanese composer, singer (d. 1993)
 April 10 – Maurice Schumann, French politician (d. 1998)
 April 13 – Donald Leslie, American creator of the Leslie speaker (d. 2004)
 April 15 – Muhammad Metwalli al-Sha'rawi, Egyptian jurist (d. 1998)
 April 18 – Maurice Goldhaber, Austrian-American physicist (d. 2011)
 April 23
 Józef Cyrankiewicz, Polish communist politician, 2-time Prime Minister of Poland (d. 1989)
 Ronald Neame, British film cinematographer, producer, screenwriter and director (d. 2010)
 April 26 – Paul Verner, German politician (d. 1986)
 April 27 – Antonio Sastre, Argentine footballer (d. 1987)
 April 28
 Lee Falk, American writer, theater director and producer (d. 1999)
 Luigi Ferrando, Italian racing cyclist (d. 2003)

May 

 May 5 – Andor Lilienthal, Hungarian chess Grandmaster (d. 2010)
 May 6 – Frank Nelson, American actor (d. 1986)
 May 7 – Ishirō Honda, Japanese film director (d. 1993)
 May 8 – Robert Johnson, American guitarist, singer (d. 1938)
 May 10 – Bel Kaufman, German-born American author (d. 2014)
 May 11 – Phil Silvers, American actor, comedian (d. 1985)
 May 12 – Dorothy Rungeling, Canadian aviator (d. 2018)
 May 15 – Max Frisch, Swiss playwright and novelist (d. 1991)
 May 16 – Tunku Puan Besar Kurshiah, Malayan queen (d. 1999)
 May 17
 Lisa Fonssagrives, Swedish model (d. 1992)
 André Jaunet, French-born flutist (d. 1988)
 Maureen O'Sullivan, Irish actress (d. 1998)
 May 18 – Big Joe Turner, African-American singer (d. 1985)
 May 20 – Gardner Fox, American writer (d. 1986)
 May 22 – Anatol Rapoport, Russian-born American mathematical psychologist (d. 2007)
 May 24 – Carleen Hutchins, American violin maker (d. 2009)
 May 25 – Eric P. Newman, American numismatist (d. 2017)
 May 27 – Teddy Kollek, Austrian-born Israeli politician, mayor of Jerusalem (d. 2007)
 Vincent Price, American actor (d. 1993)
 May 31 – Maurice Allais, French economist, Nobel Prize laureate (d. 2010)

June 

 June 3 – Ellen Corby, American actress (d. 1999)
 June 4 – Milovan Đilas, Yugoslavian Marxist (d. 1995)
 June 5 – Neel E. Kearby, American fighter ace (d. 1944)
 June 9 – Hawley Pratt, American film director, animator and illustrator (d. 1999)
 June 13
 Luis Walter Alvarez, American physicist, Nobel Prize laureate (d. 1988)
 Prince Aly Khan, Indian-born Pakistani imam of Ismaili Shi'a Islam (d. 1960)
 June 15 – Wilbert Awdry, English children's writer (d. 1997)
 June 16 – Paulo Gracindo, Brazilian actor (d. 1995)
 June 19 – Dudley Senanayake, 2nd Prime Minister of Sri Lanka (d. 1973)
 June 20 – Paul Pietsch, German racer, magazine magnate (d. 2012)
 June 21
 Irving Fein, American television, film producer (d. 2012)
 Wonderful Smith, African-American comedian (d. 2008)
 June 22
 Marie Braun, Dutch swimmer (d. 1982)
 Princess Cecilie of Greece and Denmark, wife of Hereditary Grand Duke Georg Donatus of Hesse and sister of Prince Philip, Duke of Edinburgh (d. 1937)
 Michel Dens, French baritone singer (d. 2000)
 Vernon Kirby, South African tennis player (d. 1994)
 Sir Kenneth Mather, British geneticist and botanist (d. 1990)
 June 23
 Nikolai Dmitriyevich Kuznetsov, Russian aeronautical engineer (d. 1995)
 Admiral Sir Horace Rochfort Law, British naval officer and Commander-in-Chief, Naval Home Command (March 1970 – May 1972) (d. 2005)
 David Ogilvy, British advertising executive (d. 1999)
 Hannah Weinstein, American journalist, publicist and left-wing political activist who became a television producer in Britain (d. 1984)
 June 24
 Juan Manuel Fangio, Argentine race car driver (d. 1995)
 Norman Lessing, American television screenwriter, producer, playwright, chess master and chess writer (d. 2001)
 Ernesto Sabato, Argentine writer (d. 2011)
 Portia White, Canadian opera singer (d. 1968)
 June 25
 Reed Hadley, American actor (d. 1974)
 William Howard Stein, American chemist, Nobel Prize laureate (d. 1980)
 June 26
 Toyo Shibata, Japanese poet (d. 2013)
 Babe Didrikson Zaharias, American athlete, golfer (d. 1956)
 June 27
 Ben Alexander, American actor (d. 1969)
 Marion M. Magruder, American officer (d. 1997)
 June 28
 Sir Donald Macleod Douglas, Scottish surgeon (d. 1993)
 Thalia Mara, American ballet dancer, educator and author (d. 2003)
 Lieutenant Commander Malcolm David Wanklyn, British naval officer (MIA 1942)
 June 29
 Bernard Herrmann, American composer (d. 1975)
 Lucien Lauk, French racing cyclist (d. 2001)
 Prince Bernhard of Lippe-Biesterfeld, German-born Prince Consort of the Netherlands (1948–1980) (d. 2004)
 June 30
 Czesław Miłosz, Polish-born writer, Nobel Prize laureate (d. 2004)
 Nagarjun, Indian poet (d. 1998)

July 

 July 1
 Guy Raymond, American actor (d. 1997)
 Sergei Sokolov, Marshal of the Soviet Union (d. 2012)
 July 2
 Fred Beaver, Muscogee Creek-Seminole painter and muralist (d. 1980)
 Diego Fabbri, Italian playwright (d. 1980)
 Dorothy M. Horstmann, American epidemiologist, virologist and pediatrician (d. 2001)
 Reg Parnell, British racing driver and manager (d. 1964)
 July 3
 Herbert E. Grier, American electrical engineer (d. 1999)
 Joe Hardstaff Jr, English cricketer (d. 1990)
 July 4
 Mitch Miller, American singer, television personality (d. 2010)
 Elizabeth Peratrovich, American civil rights activist (d. 1958)
 Frederick Seitz, American scientist (d. 2008)
 July 5
 Costantino Nivola, Italian sculptor (d. 1988)
 Giorgio Borġ Olivier, 7th Prime Minister of Malta (d. 1980)
 Georges Pompidou, President of France (d. 1974)
 July 6
 LaVerne Andrews, American singer (d. 1967)
 Annibale Frossi, Italian football player, manager (d. 1999)
 June Gale, American actress (d. 1996)
 July 7
 Hubert de Bèsche, Swedish fencer (d. 1997)
 Gretchen Franklin, English actress, dancer (d. 2005)
 Shunpei Hashioka, Japanese-Chinese boxer (d. 1978) 
 Gian Carlo Menotti, Italian-born American composer (d. 2007)
 Joan Perry, American film actress, model and singer (d. 1996)
 July 8
 John Dudley Ball Jr., American novelist (d. 1988)
 Vincente Gomez, Spanish guitarist and composer (d. 2001)
 Fred Kohler Jr., American actor (d. 1993)
 July 9
 Aleksandrs Laime, Latvian-born explorer (d. 1994)
 Mervyn Peake, British writer, illustrator (d. 1968)
 Svetislav Valjarević, Serbian Yugoslav international football player (d. 1996)
 John Archibald Wheeler, American physicist (d. 2008)
 July 10 – Amalia Solórzano, First Lady of Mexico (d. 2008)
 July 11
 Hyacinth Gabriel Connon, American-Filipino Lasallian Brother, president of De La Salle University in Manila (1950–1959 and 1966–1978) (d. 1978)
 Olive Cotton, Australian photographer (d. 2003)
 July 14 – William Norris, American business executive (d. 2006)
 July 15
 Max Seela, German lieutenant colonel in the Waffen-SS (d. 1999)
 Hans von Luck, German Nazi Wehrmacht officer (d. 1997)
 Paul Zoll, American cardiologist (d. 1999)
 July 16
 Ginger Rogers, American actress, dancer (d. 1995)
 Gabriele Wülker, German social scientist, civil servant (d. 2001)
 July 17 – Yang Jiang, Chinese playwright, author and translator (d. 2016)
 July 18
 Hume Cronyn, Canadian actor (d. 2003)
 Arch MacDonald, American broadcast journalist, television pioneer (d. 1985)
 July 19 – Ben Eastman, American middle-distance runner (d. 2002)
 July 19 – Loda Halama, Polish dancer and actress (d. 1996)
 July 21 – Marshall McLuhan, Canadian author (d. 1980)
 July 22 – José María Lemus, 33rd President of El Salvador (d. 1993)
 July 26 – Jerry Burke, American musician (d. 1965)
 July 28 – Ann Doran, American actress (d. 2000)
 July 29 – Ján Cikker, Slovak composer (d. 1989)
 July 31 – George Liberace, American musician (d. 1983)

August 

 August 2 – Rusty Wescoatt, American actor (d. 1987)
 August 3 – Manuel Esperón, Mexican musician, composer (d. 2011)
 August 5 – Robert Taylor, American actor (d. 1969)
 August 6
 Lucille Ball, American actress, television producer and co-owner of Desilu Productions (d. 1989)
 Norman Gordon, South African cricketer (d. 2014)
 Constance Fecher Heaven, British romance writer (d. 1995)
 August 7 – Nicholas Ray, American director (d. 1979)
 August 8 – Rosetta LeNoire, American actress (d. 2002)
 August 9 – William Alfred Fowler, American physicist, Nobel Prize laureate (d. 1995)
 August 10
 Leonidas Andrianopoulos, Greek footballer (d. 2011)
 A. N. Sherwin-White, English historian (d. 1993)
 August 11
 William H. Avery, American politician (d. 2009)
 Thanom Kittikachorn, 10th Prime Minister of Thailand (d. 2004)
 August 12 – Cantinflas, Mexican actor (d. 1993)
 August 13 – Roy Pinney, American herpetologist, photographer, war correspondent and writer (d. 2010)
 August 15 – Anthony Salerno, American gangster (d. 1992)
 August 17
 Mikhail Botvinnik, Russian chess player (d. 1995)
 Martin Sandberger, German military officer (d. 2010)
 August 18 – Amelia Boynton Robinson, African-American civil rights activist (d. 2015)
 August 23
 Betty Robinson, American Olympic athlete (d. 1999)
 Birger Ruud, Norwegian athlete (d. 1998)
 August 25 – Võ Nguyên Giáp, General of the Vietnam People's Army (d. 2013)
 August 29 – John Charnley, English orthopaedic surgeon, pioneer of hip replacement operation (d. 1982)
 August 31 – Ramón Vinay, Chilean operatic tenor (d. 1996)

September 

 September 1 – Kōmei Abe, Japanese composer (d. 2006)
 September 2 – Romare Bearden, American artist (d. 1988)
 September 6 – Harry Danning, American baseball player (d. 2004)
 September 7 – Todor Zhivkov, 36th Prime Minister of Bulgaria (d. 1998)
 September 8 – Byron Morrow, American actor (d. 2006)
 September 9
 Paul Goodman, American author (d. 1972)
 Sir John Gorton, 19th Prime Minister of Australia (d. 2002)
 September 10
 Nelly Omar, Argentine actress and singer (d. 2013)
 Renée Simonot, French actress (d. 2021)
 September 13 – Bill Monroe, American musician (d. 1996)
 September 15 – Joseph Pevney, American director (d. 2008)
 September 19 – William Golding, English writer, Nobel Prize laureate (d. 1993)
 September 24
 Konstantin Chernenko, General Secretary of the Central Committee of the Communist Party of the Soviet Union (d. 1985)
 Ed Kretz, American motorcycle racer (d. 1996)
 September 25 – Eric Williams, 1st Prime Minister of Trinidad and Tobago (d. 1981)
 September 27 – John Harvey, American actor (d. 1982)
 September 29 – Charles Court, Australian politician (d. 2007)
 September 30
 Bernd von Brauchitsch, German air force officer (d. 1974)
 Ruth Gruber, American journalist and writer (d. 2016)

October 

 October 3 – Edgar Sanabria, Venezuelan lawyer, diplomat and politician, Interim President of Venezuela (d. 1989)
 October 4 – Mary Two-Axe Earley, Canadian indigenous women's rights activist (d. 1996)
 October 5
Pierre Dansereau, Canadian ecologist (d. 2011)
Brian O'Nolan, Irish humorist (d. 1966)
 October 9 – Joe Rosenthal, American photographer (d. 2006)
 October 10 – Clare Hollingworth, English journalist (d. 2017)
 October 12 – Vijay Merchant, Indian cricketer (d. 1987)
 October 13
 Tadeusz Chyliński, Polish designer and constructor (d. 1978)
 Ashok Kumar, Indian actor (d. 2001)
 October 14 – Lê Đức Thọ, Vietnamese general and politician, recipient of the Nobel Peace Prize (d. 1990)
 October 15 – James H. Schmitz, German-born American science fiction writer (d. 1981)
 October 21
 Dick Harris, Australian rules footballer (d. 1993)
 William A. Mitchell, American food chemist, inventor (d. 2004)
 October 26
 Sid Gillman, American football coach (d. 2003)
 Mahalia Jackson, African-American gospel singer (d. 1972)
 October 27 – Leif Erickson, American actor (d. 1986)
 October 30
 Ruth Hussey, American actress (d. 2005)
 Eileen Whelan, British cricketer (d. 2021)

November 

 November 1
 Henri Troyat, French writer (d. 2007)
 Sidney Wood, American tennis player (d. 2009)
 November 2 – Odysseas Elytis, Greek writer, Nobel Prize laureate (d. 1996)
 November 5 – Roy Rogers, American singer, actor (d. 1998)
 November 7
 Yolande Beekman, French-born World War II heroine (d. 1944)
 Ángeles Santos Torroella, Spanish painter (d. 2013)
 November 12
 Yehoshua Rabinovitz, Israeli politician (d. 1979)
 Chad Varah, British priest and humanitarian (d. 2007)
 November 13 – Buck O'Neil, American baseball player, manager (d. 2006)
 November 15 – Kay Walsh, British actress (d. 2005)
 November 24 – Erik Bergman, Finnish composer (d. 2006)
 November 25 – Roelof Frankot, Dutch painter (d. 1984)
 November 26 – Robert Marchand, French cyclist (d. 2021)
 November 27
 David Merrick, American theater producer (d. 2000)
 Fe del Mundo, Filipino paediatrician (d. 2011)
 November 28 – Václav Renč, Czech poet, dramatist and translator (d. 1973)
 November 30 – Jorge Negrete, Mexican singer and actor (d. 1953)

December 

 December 1 – Walter Alston, American baseball player, manager (d. 1984)
 December 3 – Nino Rota, Italian composer (d. 1979)
 December 5 – Władysław Szpilman, Polish pianist, memoirist (d. 2000)
 December 8 – Lee J. Cobb, American actor (d. 1976)
 December 9 – Broderick Crawford, American actor (d. 1986)
 December 10 – Chet Huntley, American television reporter (d. 1974)
 December 11
 Val Guest, British film director (d. 2006)
 Naguib Mahfouz, Egyptian writer, Nobel Prize laureate (d. 2006)
 Qian Xuesen, Chinese scientist (d. 2009)
 December 13
 Trygve Haavelmo, Norwegian economist, Nobel Prize laureate (d. 1999)
 Kenneth Patchen, American poet and painter (d. 1972)
 December 14
 Jerzy Iwanow-Szajnowicz, Greek-Polish athlete, Resistance member (d. 1943)
 Spike Jones, American musician (d. 1965)
 Hans von Ohain, German physicist, designer of the first operational jet engine (d. 1998)
 December 15 – Stan Kenton, American jazz pianist, composer and arranger (d. 1979)
 December 17 – André Claveau, French singer, Eurovision Song Contest 1958 winner (d. 2003)
 December 18 – Jules Dassin, American director (d. 2008)
 December 20 – Hortense Calisher, American author (d. 2009)
 December 21 – Josh Gibson, African-American baseball player (d. 1947)
 December 23 – Niels Kaj Jerne, English-born immunologist, Nobel Prize laureate (d. 1994)
 December 25 – Louise Bourgeois, French-born American artist (d. 2010)
 December 26
 Steve Kordek, American pinball innovator (d. 2012)
 Kikuko, Princess Takamatsu of Japan (d. 2004)
 December 27
 Abdul Halim, Indonesian politician, 4th Prime Minister of Indonesia (d. 1987)
 Anna Russell, British comedian and singer (d. 2006)
 December 28 – Sam Levenson, American humorist and author (d. 1980)
 December 29 – Klaus Fuchs, German theoretical physicist, spy (d. 1988)

Deaths

January 

 January 1 – John I. Curtin, American general (b. 1837)
 January 3
 'Abd al-Ahad Khan, Emir of Bukhara (b. 1859)
 Alexandros Papadiamantis, Greek poet (b. 1851)
 January 4
 Stefano Bruzzi, Italian painter (b. 1835)
 Francesco Segna, Italian Roman Catholic cardinal (b. 1836)
 January 5
 Walter Beatty, Canadian political figure (b. 1836)
 Marcelina Darowska, Polish Roman Catholic nun, saint (b. 1827)
 January 6 – Sir John Aird, 1st Baronet, English civil engineer (b. 1833)
 January 8 – Pietro Gori, Italian lawyer, journalist and poet (b. 1865)
 January 12 – Georg Jellinek, Austrian legal philosopher (b. 1851)
 January 13 – Władysław Czachórski, Polish painter (b. 1850)
 January 15 – Carolina Coronado, Spanish poet (b. 1820)
 January 17 – Sir Francis Galton, British explorer, biologist (b. 1822)
 January 23 – Edmund Beswick, English rugby football player (b. 1858)

February 

 February 1 – Charles Stillman Sperry, American admiral (b. 1847)
 February 2 – Archduke Johann Salvator of Austria (b. 1852)
 February 4 – Piet Cronjé, Boer general (b. 1836)
 February 8 – Joaquín Costa, Spanish politician, lawyer, economist and historian (b. 1846)
 February 10 – Gustavo Maria Bruni, Italian childhood Roman Catholic servant of God (b. 1903)
 February 14 – David Boyle, Canadian archaeologist (b. 1842)
 February 15
 Theodor Escherich, German-born Austrian pediatrician (b. 1857)
 Pavel Grigorievich Dukmasov, Russian general (b. 1838)
 February 16 – Alice Morse Earle, American historian (b. 1851)
 February 18 – Buttons Briggs, American baseball player (b. 1875)
 February 21 – Isidre Nonell, Spanish painter (b. 1873)
 February 23
 Richard Henry Beddome, British military officer, naturalist (b. 1830)
 Giuditta Vannini, Italian Roman Catholic religious professed, blessed (b. 1859)
 February 25 – Fritz von Uhde, German painter (b. 1848)

March 

 March 1 – Jacobus Henricus van 't Hoff, Dutch chemist, Nobel Prize laureate (b. 1852)
 March 6
 Mary Anne Barker, English author (b. 1831)
 Thierry, Count of Limburg Stirum, Belgian historian (b. 1827)
 March 11 – Théotime Blanchard, Canadian farmer, teacher, merchant and politician (b. 1844)
 March 18
 Richard Baker, Australian politician (b. 1842)
 Anna Brackett, American feminist, educator (b. 1836)
 March 21 – Shams-ul-haq Azeemabadi, Indian Islamic scholar (b. 1857)
 March 22 – William Collins, British Anglican bishop (b. 1867)
 March 24
 Rodolphe-Madeleine Cleophas Dareste de La Chavanne, French jurist (b. 1824)
 Dragan Tsankov, Bulgarian politician, 3rd Prime Minister of Bulgaria (b. 1828)
 March 27 – Margarita Savitskaya, Russian actress (b. 1868)
 March 28 – Samuel Franklin Emmons, American geologist (b. 1841)
 March 30
 Pellegrino Artusi, Italian businessman (b. 1820)
 Ellen Swallow Richards, American chemist (b. 1842)

April 

 April 5 – Charles Frederic Moberly Bell, British journalist and newspaper editor (b. 1847)
 April 9 – Manuel Aguirre de Tejada, Spanish politician and lawyer (b. 1827)
 April 10 – Mikalojus Konstantinas Čiurlionis, Lithuanian artist and composer (b. 1875)
 April 12 – James Mathers, Irish missionary (b. 1854)
 April 14
 Addie Joss, American baseball player, Major League Baseball Hall of Fame member (b. 1880)
 Denman Thompson, American actor, playwright (b. 1833)
 April 25 – Emilio Salgari, Italian writer (b. 1862)
 April 26 – Pedro Paterno, Filipino politician (b. 1857)
 April 29 – Georg, Prince of Schaumburg-Lippe (b. 1846)

May 

 May 6 – Robert Alden, American author (b. 1836)
 May 9 – Thomas Wentworth Higginson, American Unitarian minister and abolitionist (b. 1823)
 May 16 – Gheorghe Manu, 17th Prime Minister of Romania (b. 1833)
 May 18 – Gustav Mahler, Austrian composer (b. 1860)
 May 21 – Williamina Fleming, Scottish astronomer (b. 1857)
 May 23 – John Douglas, English architect (b. 1830)
 May 24 – Dezső Bánffy, 12th Prime Minister of Hungary (b. 1843)
 May 25
 Vasily Klyuchevsky, Russian historian (b. 1841)
 William Ridley, British missionary (b. 1836)
 May 27 – Thursday October Christian II, Pitcairn Islands leader (b. 1820)
 May 29
 Benjamin Broomhall, British advocate (b. 1829)
 Daniel W. Burke, American soldier (b. 1841)
 Stephanus Jacobus du Toit, South African nationalist, theologian, journalist and politician (b. 1847)
 W. S. Gilbert, English dramatist (b. 1836)
 May 30 – Milton Bradley, American businessman and board game pioneer (b. 1836)

June 

 June 1 – Claudio Brindis de Salas Garrido, Cuban violinist (b. 1852)
 June 2 – Axel Olof Freudenthal, Finnish philologist, politician (b. 1836)
 June 5 – Édouard Bague, French aviator (b. 1879)
 June 7
 William Gordon, British Roman Catholic prelate (b. 1831)
 Maurice Rouvier, French statesman, Prime Minister of France (b. 1842)
 June 9 – Carrie Nation, American temperance activist (b. 1846)
 June 16 – Joshua H. Berkey, American publisher, minister and political activist (b. 1852)
 June 20 – Ghazaros Aghayan, Armenian writer, educator, folklorist, historian, linguist and public figure (b. 1840)
 June 23 – Cecrope Barilli, Italian painter (b. 1839)
 June 25 – Princess Maria Clotilde of Savoy (b. 1843)
 June 26 – Lucy Hughes Brown, American physician (b. 1863)

July 

 July 2
 José Dias Correia de Carvalho, Portuguese Roman Catholic bishop (b. 1830)
 Mary M. Cohen, American social economist (b. 1854)
 Clement A. Evans, American Confederate general (b. 1833)
 July 5
 Maria Pia of Savoy, Queen consort of Portugal (b. 1847)
 George Johnstone Stoney, Irish physicist (b. 1826)
 July 6 – Princess Alexandra of Saxe-Altenburg (b. 1830)
 July 8 – Henry Perrine Baldwin, American businessman (b. 1842)
 July 11 – Laura Jacinta Rittenhouse, American temperance activist and juvenile literature author (b. 1841)
 July 14 – Ignaz von Peczely, Hungarian scientist, physician and homeopath (b. 1826)
 July 15
 Carlo Ademollo, Italian painter (b. 1824)
 Louisa Cavendish, Duchess of Devonshire (b. 1832)
 July 16 – August Harambašić, Croatian writer (b. 1861)
 July 17 – Rufino José Cuervo, Colombian linguist, philologist and writer (b. 1844)
 July 19 – Manuel Iradier, Spanish explorer and Africanist (b. 1854)
 July 20 – Caleb Cook Baldwin, American Presbyterian missionary (b. 1820)
 July 25
 Edmund Bogdanowicz, Polish poet, writer and journalist (b. 1857)
 Carmen Salles y Barangueras, Spanish Roman Catholic religious professed and saint (b. 1848)
 July 26 – José Alves de Cerqueira César, Brazilian politician (b. 1835)

August 

 August 1
 Edwin Austin Abbey, American painter (b. 1852)
 Konrad Duden, German philologist (b. 1829)
 August 6 – Florentino Ameghino, Argentine naturalist, paleontologist, anthropologist and zoologist (b. 1853)
 August 7
 Elizabeth Akers Allen, American poet and journalist (b. 1832)
 José Rafael Balmaceda, Chilean politician, diplomat (b. 1850)
 August 11
 Isabela de Rosis, Italian Roman Catholic religious sister, servant of God and Venerable (b. 1842)
 Albert Ladenburg, German chemist (b. 1842)
 August 12 – Jules Brunet, French military leader (b. 1838)
 August 14 – Henry Rathbone, Union Army officer and diplomat (b. 1837)
 August 15 – William R. Badger, American pioneer aviator (b. 1886)
 August 16 – Patrick Francis Moran, Australian cardinal, Archbishop of Sydney (b. 1830)
 August 17 – Petro Nini Luarasi, Albanian activist (b. 1854)
 August 29 – Mahbub Ali Khan of Hyderabad (b. 1886)
 August 31 – Benjamin Grierson, American Civil War general (b. 1826)

September 

 September 4 – John Francon Williams, Welsh-born journalist, writer, geographer, historian, cartographer and inventor (b. 1854)
 September 7 – Friedrich Breitfuss, Russian philatelist (b. 1851)
 September 12 – William Alexander, Irish Anglican bishop, Primate of All Ireland (b. 1824)
 September 15 – Joel Benton, American writer, poet and lecturer (b. 1832)
 September 16 – Edward Whymper, British explorer, mountaineer (b. 1840)
 September 18 – Pyotr Stolypin, 3rd Prime Minister of Russia (assassinated) (b. 1862)
 September 20 – Sir Robert Hart, 1st Baronet, British diplomat (b. 1835)
 September 23 – John Arthur Barry, British-born Australian journalist, author (b. 1850)
 September 25 – Emma Helen Blair, American journalist, editor (b. 1851)
 September 29 – Henry Northcote, 1st Baron Northcote, 3rd Governor-General of Australia (b. 1846)
 September 30 – Sir Herbert Risley, British ethnographer and colonial administrator (b. 1851)

October 

 October – Blanche Atkinson, British novelist (b. 1847)
 October 1 – Wilhelm Dilthey, German psychologist, sociologist and philosopher (b. 1833)
 October 2 – Winfield Scott Schley, American admiral (b. 1839)
 October 3 – Carolina Beatriz Ângelo, Portuguese physician (b. 1878)
 October 5 – William Astley, Australian writer (b. 1855)
 October 7
 John Hughlings Jackson, English neurologist (b. 1835)
 Elmer McCurdy, American outlaw (b. 1880)
 October 8 – Lee Batchelor, Australian politician (b. 1865)
 October 9
 Cornelius Newton Bliss, American merchant, politician and collector (b. 1833)
 Antonio Borrero, 10th President of Ecuador (b. 1827)
 October 11
 Dimitar Agura, Bulgarian historian (b. 1849)
 Henry Broadhurst, British trade unionist, politician (b. 1840)
 Elena Arellano Chamorro, Nicaraguan pioneer educator (b. 1836)
 October 13 – Miguel Malvar, Filipino general (b. 1865)
 October 14 – John Marshall Harlan, U.S. Supreme Court Justice (b. 1833)
 October 17 – José López Domínguez, Spanish military officer, politician and 24th Prime Minister of Spain (b. 1829)
 October 18 – Alfred Binet, French psychologist (b. 1857)
 October 19 – Eugene Burton Ely, American aviation pioneer (b. 1886)
 October 24 – Ida Lewis, American lighthouse keeper (b. 1842)
 October 27 – Arthur Lloyd, British Anglican missionary (b. 1852)
 October 28 – Clement V. Rogers, Cherokee politician, father of Will Rogers (b. 1839)
 October 29 – Joseph Pulitzer, Hungarian-born newspaper publisher, journalist (b. 1847)
 October 30 – Elizabeth Herbert, Baroness Herbert of Lea, English Catholic writer, translator, philanthropist and social figure (b. 1822)
 October 31 – John Joseph Montgomery, American glider pioneer (b. 1858)

November 

 November 2 – Kyrle Bellew, English actor (b. 1850)
 November 3 – George Chrystal, British mathematician (b. 1851)
 November 7
 Constantin Budisteanu, Romanian soldier, politician (b. 1838)
 Nathaniel Bull, Australian politician (b. 1842)
 November 8 – Oscar Bielaski, American baseball player (b. 1847)
 November 9 – Howard Pyle, American artist and fiction writer (b. 1853)
 November 10 – Christian Lundeberg, Swedish politician, 10th Prime Minister of Sweden (b. 1842)
 November 11 – Josef Roman Lorenz, Austrian naturalist (b. 1825)
 November 14 – Francis Buxton, British barrister and politician (b. 1847)
 November 19
 Billy Beaumont, English football player (b. 1883)
 Ramón Cáceres, 31st President of the Dominican Republic (b. 1866)
 November 20 – Sophia Frances Anne Caulfeild, British needlework artist (b. 1824)
 November 22
 William George Aston, British consular official (b. 1841)
 John Sanford Barnes, American businessman (b. 1836)
 November 23
 James George Bell, American businessman, settler (b. 1831)
 Bernard Tancred, South African cricketer (b. 1865)
 November 25 – Paul Lafargue, French Marxist theorist, activist (b. 1842)
 November 26
 Komura Jutarō, Japanese statesman (b. 1855)
 Nikola Hristić, Prime Minister of Serbia (b. 1818)
 November 28 – Preston Jacobus, American developer, businessman and politician (b. 1864)
 November 29 – Stanley Calvert Clarke, British army officer, courtier

December 

 December 1 – Vassily Maximov, Russian painter (b. 1844)
 December 2
 George Davidson, English-born American geodesist, astronomer, geographer, surveyor and engineer (b. 1825)
 Eugène Alphonse Dyer, Canadian merchant, farmer and political figure (b. 1838)
 December 7 – Robert Maitland Brereton, English railway engineer (b. 1834)
 December 9 – Blessed Bernard Mary of Jesus, Italian Roman Catholic priest, blessed (b. 1831)
 December 10 – Sir Joseph Dalton Hooker, English botanist (b. 1817)
 December 11 – Thomas Ball, American sculptor, musician (b. 1819)
 December 13 – Nikolay Beketov, Russian chemist (b. 1827)
 December 19 – John Bigelow, American lawyer, statesman (b. 1817)
 December 20 – Rose Eytinge, American actress (b. 1835)
 December 21
 Catharine H. T. Avery, American author and editor (b. 1844)
 Emilio Estrada Carmona, 18th President of Ecuador (b. 1855)
 December 22
 Mary Jane Coggeshall, American suffragist (b. 1836)
 Odilon Lannelongue, French surgeon (b. 1840)
 December 24 – Hyacinth (Jacek) Gulski, American Roman Catholic priest (b. 1847)
 December 25 – Arthur F. Griffith, American calculating prodigy (b. 1880)

Nobel Prizes 

 Physics – Wilhelm Wien
 Chemistry – Marie Curie
 Medicine – Allvar Gullstrand
 Literature – Maurice Maeterlinck
 Peace – Tobias Asser

References

Further reading 
 New International year book: 1911 comprehensive, global coverage online
 Britannica year-book, 1913 (1913) covers 1911 and 1912, global coverage
 Gilbert, Martin. A History of the Twentieth Century: Volume 1 1900-1933 (1997); global coverage of politics, diplomacy and warfare; pp 225–44.